Mohammad Dhahir Baluch  is the current leader of Jundallah. Dhahir Baluch has been leading Jundallah since February 2010. According to the Islamic Republic News Agency, he is the main suspect of the bombings in Zahedan on 16 July 2010 and the Chabahar bombings. He is wanted by the Iranian judiciary.

References

Baloch people
Iranian rebels
Jundallah (Iran)
Fugitives wanted by Iran
Leaders of Islamic terror groups
Living people
Year of birth missing (living people)